Louis IV the Saint (28 October 1200 – 11 September 1227), a member of the Ludovingian dynasty, was Landgrave of Thuringia and Saxon Count palatine from 1217 until his death. He was the husband of Elizabeth of Hungary.

Biography
Louis was born at Creuzburg Castle, the second son of Landgrave Hermann I of Thuringia, from his marriage with Sophia, a daughter of the Wittelsbach duke Otto I of Bavaria. During the German throne quarrel between the Hohenstaufen ruler Philip of Swabia and his Welf rival Otto IV, his father switched sides several times and tried to expand his own influence by betrothing his eldest son Hermann to the Hungarian princess Elizabeth, daughter of King Andrew II. The young girl arrived in Thuringia in 1211 to be raised at the Ludovingian court, then a venue for poets and minnesingers like Walther von der Vogelweide or Wolfram von Eschenbach.

Louis elder brother died in 1216, therefore he himself, upon his father's death on 25 April 1217, ascended the Thuringian throne at the age of sixteen.

In 1218, on the Feast of St. Kilian, at age eighteen, he was armed as a knight in the Church of St. George in Eisenach. At Wartburg Castle in 1220 at age twenty, Louis married 14-year-old Elizabeth of Hungary, with whom he had three children: Hermann II, Sophie, and Gertrude, later abbess at Altenberg. He set up his court at Wartburg Castle near Eisenach.

When in 1221 Louis' Wettin brother-in-law, Margrave Theodoric I of Meissen died, he acted as a guardian for Theodoric's minor son Henry III. However, his attempts to occupy the Meissen and Lusatian lands were rejected by his sister Jutta. Like his father, Louis was in close contact with the Hohenstaufen emperor Frederick II, who appointed him a Marshal of the Holy Roman Empire and confirmed his rights in the Margraviate of Meissen.
 
In 1226, Louis was called to the Diet in Cremona, where he promised Emperor Frederick II to take up the cross and accompany him to the Holy Land. He embarked for the Sixth Crusade in 1227, partly inspired also by the tales of his uncle, who had been to the Levant with the Holy Roman Emperor. Fellow-travellers were five counts, Louis von Wartburg, Gunther von Kefernberg, Meinrad von Mühlberg, Heinrich von Stolberg, and Burkhard von Brandenberg; Louis left his pregnant wife behind, who had a premonition that they would never meet again.

In August 1227 Louis traversed the mountains between Thuringia and Upper Franconia, through the duchies of Swabia and Bavaria, crossing the Tyrolian Alps. He fell ill of plague after reaching Brindisi and Otranto in the Kingdom of Sicily. He received extreme unction from the Patriarch of Jerusalem and the Bishop of Santa Croce. He died before reaching Otranto in 1227. A few days after his death, his daughter Gertrude was born. Louis's remains were buried in Reinhardsbrunn Abbey in 1228. He was succeeded by his five-year-old son Hermann II, under the tutelage of his uncle Henry Raspe.

After his death, Elizabeth left the court, made arrangements for the care of her children, and in 1228, renounced the world, becoming a tertiary of St. Francis of Assisi. She built the Franciscan hospital at Marburg and devoted herself to the care of the sick until her death at the age of 24 in 1231. She was officially proclaimed a saint only four years after her death. While Louis was never formally canonized, he became known among the German people as Louis the saint. He is known elsewhere as Blessed Louis of Thuringia.

Family and children
He and Elizabeth of Hungary had the following children:
 Hermann II, Landgrave of Thuringia (1222–1241), married Helen, daughter of Duke Otto I of Brunswick-Lüneburg
 Sophie of Thuringia (1224–1275), married Duke Henry II of Brabant; their son Henry became the progenitor of the House of Hesse
 Gertrude (1227–1297), abbess of the Premonstratensian monastery of Altenberg near Wetzlar; she was beatified by Pope Clement VI in 1348.

Explanatory notes

References

Literature
 Walter Heinemeyer: Ludwig IV the Saint, Landgrave of Thuringia and Count Palatine of Saxony. In: New German Biography (NDB). Volume 15, Duncker & Humblot, Berlin, 1987, S. 422 f. (digitized).
 Helga aq: Ludwig IV, the Holy, in: shape perception and memory medium German sculpture in the 14th century. A contribution to medieval grave monuments, epitaphs and curiosities in Saxony, Saxony-Anhalt, Thuringia, North Hesse, North-Rhine Westphalia and southern Lower Saxony. Volume 2. Catalog of selected objects from the High Middle Ages to the early 15th century. Tenea Verlag, Berlin 2006, S. 538 f. with Fig. 799 f. .
 Karl Robert Wenck: Louis IV, Holy, Landgrave of Thuringia. In: General German Biography (ADB). Volume 19, Duncker & Humblot, Leipzig 1884, S. 594–597.

Sources

External links
 http://www.deutsche-biographie.de/sfz54810.html

1200 births
1227 deaths
People from Wartburgkreis
German Roman Catholic saints
Rulers of Thuringia
13th-century Christian saints
Regents of Germany
13th-century viceregal rulers
13th-century monarchs in Europe
Landgraves of Thuringia
Roman Catholic royal saints
Ludovingians
Christians of the Sixth Crusade
Royal reburials